A charity shop (British English), thrift shop or thrift store (American English and Canadian English) or opportunity shop or op-shop (Australian English and New Zealand English) is a retail establishment run by a charitable organization to raise money. Charity shops are a type of social enterprise. They sell mainly used goods such as clothing, books, music albums, shoes, DVDs, toys, and furniture donated by members of the public, and are often staffed by volunteers. Because the items for sale were obtained for free, and business costs are low, the items can be sold at competitive prices.  After costs are paid, all remaining income from the sales is used in accord with the organization's stated charitable purpose. Costs include purchase and/or depreciation of fixtures (clothing racks, bookshelves, counters, etc.), operating costs (maintenance, municipal service fees, electricity, heat, telephone, limited advertising) and the building lease or mortgage.

Some charity shops also offer for sale a limited amount of edibles such as soda drinks, water, ice cream, snacks, and candy. When available, these items are usually near the stores' cashiers.

Terminology
Charity shops may also be referred to as thrift stores (in the United States and Canada), hospice shops, resale shops (a term that in the United States also covers consignment shops), opportunity (or op) shops (in Australia and New Zealand), and second-hands (секонд-хенды) in Russia.

History
One of the earliest known charity shops in the United Kingdom was set up by the Wolverhampton Society for the Blind (now called the Beacon Centre for the Blind) in 1899 to sell goods made by blind people to raise money for the Society. During World War I, various fund-raising activities occurred, such as a charity bazaar in Shepherd Market, London, which made £50,000 for the Red Cross.

However, it was during the Second World War that the charity shop became widespread. Edinburgh University Settlement opened their "Thrift Shop for Everyone" in Edinburgh in 1937, the Red Cross opened up its first charity shop at 17 Old Bond Street, London in 1941. For the duration of the war, over two hundred “permanent” Red Cross gift shops and about 150 temporary Red Cross shops were opened. A condition of the shop licence issued by the Board of Trade was that all goods offered for sale were gifts. Purchase for re-sale was forbidden. The entire proceeds from sales had to be passed to the Duke of Gloucester’s Red Cross or the St John Fund. Most premises were lent free of rent and in some cases owners also met the costs of heating and lighting.

The first Oxfam charity shop in the United Kingdom was established by Cecil Jackson-Cole in Broad Street, Oxford, and began trading in December 1947.

Popularity

In the early 2010s, shopping at a charity shop became popular enough to earn a name in the United States: thrifting. Environmentalists may prefer buying second-hand goods as this uses fewer natural resources and would usually do less damage to the environment than by buying new goods would, in part because the goods are usually collected locally.  In addition, reusing second-hand items is a form of recycling, and thus reduces the amount of waste going to landfill sites. People who oppose sweatshops often purchase second-hand clothing as an alternative to supporting clothing companies with dubious ethical practices.  People who desire authentic vintage clothing typically shop at charity shops since most clothing that is donated is old and/or out of normal fashion (often from a recently deceased person who had not updated their clothing for a long time). Many YouTube channels make thrifting videos showcasing fashionable and unusual finds.

Second-hand goods are considered to be quite safe. The South Australian Public Health Directorate says that the health risk of buying used clothing is very low. It explains that washing purchased items in hot water is just one of several ways to eliminate the risk of contracting infectious diseases.

Charity shops also tend to be relatively inexpensive which has led to an increase in their popularity during the United Kingdom cost of living crisis. Another reason for charity shop popularity is the chance to occasionally find rare or collectible items at these stores.

Sale of new goods
Some charity shops, such as PDSA , also sell a range of new goods which may be branded to the charity, or have some connection with the cause the charity supports. Oxfam stores, for example, sell fair trade food and crafts. Charity shops may receive overstock or obsolete goods from local for-profit businesses; the for-profit businesses benefit by taking a tax write-off and clearing unwanted goods from their store instead of throwing the goods out, which is costly.

Charity shops by region

Australia

In Australia, major national opportunity shop chains include the St. Vincent de Paul Thrift Store (trading as Vinnies) which operate 627 shops across Australia, Anglicare Shops, that currently operate in 19 locations across Sydney and the Illawarra also various locations around Australia, the Salvation Army (trading as Salvos), the Red Cross, MS Research Australia, and the Brotherhood of St. Laurence. Many local charitable organisations, both religious and secular, run opportunity shops.  Common among these are missions and animal shelters.

Canada 
The Mennonite Central Committee operates 85 thrift stores in Canada and United States. Beginning in 1972, the first MCC Thrift Store opened in Altona, Manitoba.

Denmark 
Most of the charity shops in Denmark are operated by either The Danish Red Cross or by christian organizations. The Danish Red Cross has 250 shops in the country and 10,000 volunteers working in the shops. DanChurchAid has since 1972 operated charity shops, and currently operates 114 shops. The Blue Cross, founded as a christian organization, runs 55 charity shops in the country, and focuses mainly on helping alcoholics, addicts and other socially marginalized groups.

A study from 2019 shows that danes on average had spent 5.475 kr. on second-hand items the last 12 months, and that 77% of danes had either shopped or sold second-hand, although the study was not exclusive to charity shops.

New Zealand
A large variety of opshops exist throughout New Zealand. Some are secular and some belong to religious organisations. Charities include St Vincent de Pauls (Vinnies), 60+ shops; The Salvation Army (Sallies), 112+ shops; The Red Cross, 53 shops; Opportunity for Animals, 2 shops; The SPCA, 24 shops; Orphan's Aid, 7 shops; and Hospice Shops, 125+ shops.

The term 'opshop' is often used to mean any second-hand shop regardless of its charitable status.

United Kingdom

Oxfam has the largest number of charity shops in the UK with over 700 shops. Many Oxfam shops also sell books, and the organization now operates over 70 specialist Oxfam Bookshops, making them the largest retailer of second-hand books in the United Kingdom. Other Oxfam affiliates also have shops, such as Jersey, Germany, Ireland (45 shops in NI/ROI), the Netherlands and Hong Kong. Other charities with a strong presence on high streets in the UK include The Children's Society, YMCA, British Heart Foundation, Barnardos, Cancer Research UK, Shelter, Roy Castle Lung Cancer Foundation, Age UK (formerly Age Concern and Help the Aged), Marie Curie Cancer Care, Norwood, Save the Children, Scope, PDSA, Naomi House Children's Hospice and Sue Ryder Care. Many local hospices also operate charity shops to raise funds.

There are over 9,000 charity shops in the UK and Republic of Ireland. Their locations can be found on the Charity Retail Association (CRA) website, along with information on charity retail, what shops can and can't accept, etc. The CRA is a member organisation for charities which run shops. British charity shops are mainly staffed by unpaid volunteers, with a paid shop manager. Goods for sale are predominantly from donations - 87% according to the official estimate. Donations should be taken directly to a charity shop during opening hours, as goods left on the street may be stolen or damaged by passers-by or inclement weather. In expensive areas, donations include a proportion of good quality designer clothing and charity shops in these areas are sought out for cut-price fashions. 'Standard' charity shops sell a mix of clothing, books, toys, videos, DVDs, music (like CDs, cassette tapes and vinyl) and bric-a-brac (like cutlery and ornaments). Some shops specialise in certain areas, like vintage clothing, furniture, electrical items, or records.

The two largest charity shops in the UK are run by Emmaus. Emmaus Preston store opened in 2016 is on one level and covers 47,000 square feet and Emmaus in Rochdale operate a three floor Department Store since January 2019 which offers the department store feel to the charity store. These stores are run by Emmaus Companions and the money they generate directly benefit the people who work in it. Both stores sell predominantly furniture and white goods but include smaller concessions of clothes, bric-a-brac, books and music.

Almost all charity shops sell on their unsold textiles (i.e. unfashionable, stained or damaged fabric) to textile processors. Each charity shop saves an average of 40 tonnes of textiles every year, by selling them in the shop, or passing them on to these textile merchants for recycling or reuse. This grosses to around 363,000 tonnes across all charity shops in the UK; based on 2010 landfill tax value at £48 per tonne, the value of textiles reused or passed for recycling by charity shops in terms of savings in landfill tax is £17,424,000 p.a. Gift Aid is a UK tax incentive for individual donors where, subject to a signed declaration being held by the charity, income tax paid on donations can be reclaimed by the charity. Although initially intended only for cash donations, the scheme now (since 2006) allows tax on the income earned by charity shops acting as agent for the donor to be reclaimed.

Charity shops in the UK get mandatory 80% relief on business rates on their premises, which is funded by central government (not by local ratepayers) and is one illustration of their support for the charity sector and the role of charity shops in raising funds for charities. Charities can apply for discretionary relief on the remaining 20%, which is an occasional source of criticism from retailers which have to pay in full.

Largest charity retailers 
The Charity Shops Survey 2017 revealed the ten largest charity retailers in the UK based on annual income and number of stores.

United States

In the United States, major national thrift shop operators include Goodwill Industries, Salvation Army, St. Vincent de Paul Thrift Store, and ReStore (operated by Habitat for Humanity). Value Village/Savers, while looking like a thrift store and selling donated goods, is actually a private, for-profit company. Regional operators include Deseret Industries in the Western United States, and those run by AbleLight in the Upper Midwest.  Many local charitable organizations, both religious and secular, operate thrift stores. Common among these are missions, children's homes, homeless shelters, and animal shelters. In addition, some thrift stores are operated by churches as fundraising venues that support activities and missionary work.

See also
Consignment
Car boot sale
Flea market
Give-away shop
Jumble sale
Surplus store
Sustainable clothing

References

External links
 Charity Retail Association (UK)